Gustave Jules René Coty (20 March 188222 November 1962) was President of France from 1954 to 1959. He was the second and last president of the Fourth French Republic.

Early life and politics
René Coty was born in Le Havre and studied at the University of Caen, where he graduated in 1902, receiving degrees in law and philosophy. He worked as a lawyer in his hometown of Le Havre, specialising in maritime and commercial law.

He also became involved in politics, as a member of the Radical Party, and in 1907 was elected as a district councillor. The following year he was elected to the communal council of Le Havre as a member of the Republican Left group. He retained both of these positions until 1919. Coty also served as a member of the Conseil Général of Seine-Inférieure from 1913 to 1942, holding the post of vice president from 1932.

When the First World War broke out, Coty volunteered for the army, joining the 129th Infantry Regiment. He fought at the Battle of Verdun. He entered the Chamber of Deputies in 1923, succeeding Jules Siegfried as Deputy for Seine-Inférieure. However, by this stage of his political career Coty had moved away from the Radical Party, and sat as a member of the Republican Union. Between 13 and 23 December 1930 he served as Under-secretary of State for the Interior in the government of Théodore Steeg.

In 1936, Coty was elected to the Senate for Seine-Inférieure. He was one of the French parliamentarians who, on 10 July 1940, voted to give extraordinary powers to Philippe Pétain, thereby bringing about the Nazi-backed Vichy government. Coty remained relatively inactive during the Second World War, although he was rehabilitated after the war.

Postwar life and presidency
He was a member of the Constituent National Assembly from 1944 to 1946, and chaired the right-wing Independent Republican group, which later became part of the National Center of Independents and Peasants. Coty was elected to the National Assembly in 1946 as a Deputy for Seine-Inférieure, and from November 1947 to September 1948, he served as Minister for Reconstruction and Urban Planning in the governments of Robert Schuman and André Marie. Coty was elected as a member of the Council of the Republic in November 1948, and served as Vice President of the Council from 1952.

Coty stood as a candidate for president in 1953, although it was thought unlikely that he would be elected. Nonetheless, and despite twelve successive ballots, right-wing favourite Joseph Laniel failed to obtain the absolute majority required. Following the withdrawal of another key right-wing candidate, Louis Jacquinot, Coty was finally elected in the thirteenth ballot on 23 December 1953, winning 477 votes against the 329 of socialist Marcel-Edmond Naegelen. He succeeded Vincent Auriol as president on 16 January 1954.

As President of the Republic, Coty was even less active than his predecessor in trying to influence policy. His presidency was troubled by the political instability of the Fourth Republic and the Algerian question. With the deepening of the crisis in 1958, on 29 May of that year, President Coty appealed to Charles de Gaulle, the "most illustrious of Frenchmen" to become the last Prime Minister of the Fourth Republic. Coty had threatened to resign if de Gaulle's appointment was not approved by the National Assembly.

De Gaulle drafted a new constitution, and on 28 September, a referendum took place in which 79.2% of those who voted supported the proposals, which led to the Fifth Republic. De Gaulle was elected as president of the new republic by parliament in December, and succeeded Coty on 9 January 1959. Coty was a member of the Constitutional Council from 1959 until his death in 1962.

In popular culture
A photo of President Coty is a running joke in the 2006 French spy spoof OSS 117: Cairo, Nest of Spies.

See also
 Politics of France

References

External links

 An AP obituary of René Coty, 23 November 1962.

|-

1882 births
1962 deaths
20th-century presidents of France
20th-century Princes of Andorra
Democratic Republican Alliance politicians
Deputies of the 1st National Assembly of the French Fourth Republic
20th-century French lawyers
French military personnel of World War I
French Senators of the Third Republic
Government ministers of France
2
2
Honorary Knights Grand Cross of the Order of the Bath
Members of the Constituent Assembly of France (1945)
Members of the Constituent Assembly of France (1946)
Members of the 12th Chamber of Deputies of the French Third Republic
Members of the 13th Chamber of Deputies of the French Third Republic
Members of the 14th Chamber of Deputies of the French Third Republic
Members of the 15th Chamber of Deputies of the French Third Republic
Politicians from Le Havre
People of the Cold War
University of Caen Normandy alumni
Senators of Seine-Maritime